Koumala is a town in the Bamingui-Bangoran Prefecture of the northern Central African Republic.

Transport
The town is served by Koumala Airport.

External links
Satellite map at Maplandia

Populated places in Bamingui-Bangoran